Walter Burgwyn Jones (October 16, 1888 – August 1, 1963) was an American judge, legislator, and writer from Alabama.

Political career
Jones served in the Alabama House of Representatives, as a Democrat, from 1919 to 1920. He was then a circuit court judge until 1935. Jones was a presiding judge from 1935 to 1963.

In 1956, Jones granted an injunction against the operation of the National Association for the Advancement of Colored People within the state of Alabama. The injunction had been prepared secretly by state Attorney General John Malcolm Patterson and was granted by Jones "in a stunning abuse of judicial power ... without so much as a public hearing." The injunction also demanded the NAACP hand over the names and addresses of every Alabama member of the organization.

While presiding over New York Times Co. v. Sullivan in 1960, Jones ruled that the presence of an Alabama lawyer representing The New York Times contributed to the existence of a substantial business interest in the state of Alabama. This ruling ensured that the lawsuit would play out in his own courtroom. In so doing, he overruled his own book, Alabama Pleading and Practice.  Jones was an avowed white-supremacist. While presiding in Sullivan, Jones began by lecturing against "racial agitators" and in praise of "white man's justice."

Personal life
Walter Burgwyn Jones was also a writer. His father was Thomas G. Jones, the Governor of Alabama. Jones was born in Montgomery, Alabama; he went to Alabama Polytechnic Institute in 1906 and 1907. Jones then received his law degree in 1909 from the University of Alabama School of Law.

United States presidential election of 1956
In the 1956 Presidential election, faithless elector W. F. Turner cast his vote for Jones, who was a circuit court judge in Turner's home town, for President of the United States and Herman E. Talmadge for Vice President, instead of voting for Adlai Stevenson and Estes Kefauver.

Published works
Alabama practices and forms 1947
Jones' equity pleading and practices 1954
Confederate war poems 1959
Alabama pleading and practice at law 1960
Citizenship and voting in Alabama 1947
Alabama secedes from the Union 1900
Alabama jury instructions 1953
John Burgwin, Carolinian, John Jones, Virginian, Their Ancestors and Descedents 1913

References

External links

1888 births
1963 deaths
Democratic Party members of the Alabama House of Representatives
Alabama state court judges
Writers from Montgomery, Alabama
American legal writers
Candidates in the 1956 United States presidential election
20th-century American politicians
Politicians from Montgomery, Alabama
Auburn University alumni
University of Alabama School of Law alumni
History of racism in Alabama
American white supremacists
20th-century American judges
Lawyers from Montgomery, Alabama